Jake Malone (born 1996) is an Irish hurler who plays for Dublin Senior Championship club Cuala and at inter-county level with the Dublin senior hurling team. He currently lines out as a midfielder.

Career

Malone first came to prominence at club level during a golden age for the Cuala club. He lined out at midfield when the club won consecutive All-Ireland Club Championship titles in 2017 and 2018. He has also won two Leinster Club Championship titles and five County Club Championship titles. Malone first lined out at inter-county level with the Dublin minor team in 2014, before winning a Leinster Championship medal with the under-21 team in 2016. He made his debut with the Dublin senior hurling team in 2017.

Career statistics

Honours

Cuala
All-Ireland Senior Club Hurling Championship: 2017, 2018
Leinster Senior Club Hurling Championship: 2016, 2017
Dublin Senior Hurling Championship: 2015, 2016, 2017, 2019, 2020

Dublin
Leinster Under-21 Hurling Championship: 2016

References

External link
Jake Malone profile at the Dublin GAA website

1996 births
Living people
UCD hurlers
Cuala hurlers
Dublin inter-county hurlers